Education in Bangladesh is overseen by the country's Ministry of Education. The Ministry of Primary and Mass Education is responsible for implementing policy for primary education and state-funded schools at a local level. In Bangladesh, all citizens must undertake ten years of compulsory education which consists of five years at primary school level and five years at high school level. Primary and secondary education is financed by the state and free of charge in public schools.

Bangladesh conforms fully to the UN's Education For All (EFA) objectives and the Millennium Development Goals (MDG) as well as other education-related international declarations. Now; the government of the People's Republic of Bangladesh tends to align the curriculum that meets the "Goal: SDG-4" that is the "Quality Education" characterized in the charter of “Sustainable Development Goal 4”. Sustainable Development Goal 4 (SDG 4 or Global Goal 4) is about quality education and is among the 17 Sustainable Development Goals established by the United Nations in September 2015. The full title of SDG 4 is "Ensure inclusive and equitable quality education and promote lifelong learning opportunities for all". Article 17 of the Bangladesh Constitution provides that all children receive free and compulsory education.

The Human Rights Measurement Initiative (HRMI) finds that Bangladesh is fulfilling only 82.5% of what it should be fulfilling for the right to education based on the country's level of income. HRMI breaks down the right to education by looking at the rights to both primary education and secondary education. While taking into consideration Bangladesh's income level, the nation is achieving 88.7% of what should be possible based on its resources (income) for primary education but only 76.3% for secondary education. Again; the budgetary allocation is too meagre that the following source reiterates-

Out of the total budget of Tk 678,064 crore for FY23, the allocation for the education sector is Tk 81,449 crore or 12 percent of the total, compared to 11.9 percent in FY22. In terms of GDP ratio, it is 1.83 percent, lower than the outgoing fiscal year's allocation. This is one of the lowest in the world – far below the recommended minimum of 4–6 percent of GDP and 20 percent of the national budget.

Education system

The main education system is divided into three levels:  
 Primary level (class 1–5)
 Secondary level (6–12): There is no middle school system in Bangladesh.
 Tertiary level

At all levels of schooling, students can choose to receive their education in English or Bangla. Private schools tend to make use of English-based study media while government-sponsored schools use Bangla.

National Curriculum 
Bangladeshi National School Curriculum provides textbooks, takes standardized tests via one of two languages: English and Bangla (Bengali).

A student is expected to complete 12 years of education up to class 12. The curriculum does not include pre-school.

There is no choice of subjects offered to students under this curriculum until class 9 and again at class 11 when a student is expected to choose between 3 streams of education:

 Arts
 Commerce
 Science (Total 11 subjects must be studied for Science students).

In class 9–10 and 11–12, each has its own pre-selected set of subjects with one optional subject which can be changed. For instance, a student studying in Science group can't replace Chemistry, Bangla or Religion for Accounting or History. But he can replace Higher Math or Biology for Arts & Crafts. In other words, a student of this curriculum have to study a pre-set group of subjects with having only one choice of replacing an elective subject to another elective subject. Science is the most sought after stream of education in urban areas.

A standardized exam is held in class 8 called Junior School Certificate examination, schools often restrict students getting less than their set Grade Point Average (GPA) from pursuing Science stream of education.

100% of the mark obtained in certificates of PEC (class 5), JSC (class 8), SSC (class 10), and HSC (class 12) examinations is obtained from standardized written tests, Multiple choice questions, Practical part, and viva-voice involved with practical part. Classroom performance, homework and assignments play no part in a student's certificate. Standardized written tests (Creative part) and Multiple Choice Questions (MCQ) are taken in a single sitting without breaks. A student is given a blank answer script separate from the question paper to answer creative part, and a separate Optical Mark Reader (OMR) sheet to mark answers to Multiple Choice Questions. Time allocation for MCQ and CQ parts are separate and strictly enforced, OMR sheet is taken away after the allocated time, and CQ question is provided. Practical Part is taken in another sitting on a separate day, viva-voice is taken during practical exam simultaneously.

Concerning lesser than expected outcome of this curriculum, the ministry of education along with NCTB is about to implement a completely reformed curriculum starting from 2023 and completely implemented in 2027. The new curriculum is approved by Ministry of Education and currently undergoing piloting in selected schools in 2022.

Upcoming National Curriculum 
The approved major overhaul of the current curriculum is about to be implemented nationwide for classes 1–12 starting from classes 6 and 7 in 2023, classes 8 and 9 in 2024, class 10 in 2025, class 11 in 2026, and finally class 12 in 2027. The new curriculum is expected to reduce the need of after school coaching centres as there will be various activities involved in the learning process offering students a better understanding of each topics. It is expected to shift our curriculum from an outcome-centric one to a competency-based one with 10 selected competencies a student is supposed to possess at completion of class 12 with emphasis on character building. Education minister Dr Dipu Moni believes "Role of teachers will change under the new curriculum".

Under the initiative, newly written books will be provided to all students of the national curriculum. Number of subjects will decrease, there will be topics covering mental and physical health under a subject called "Wellbeing" or "Bhalo Thaka (Staying well)". Separate streams of education (Arts, Commerce, Science) will be eliminated for only 10 uniform subjects for classes 6–10 and SSC candidates, but such streams will remain for classes 11–12 or HSC candidates. Standardized board exams PEC (class 5) and JSC (class 8) will be abolished to reduce exam centric teaching and learning.

A significant part of the evaluation will come from class performance. There will be no standardized tests at schools or board up to class 3, students of grades one to three will be evaluated on the basis of their classroom performance alone. Besides a significant percentage of marks will come from classroom performance and continuous evaluation in their own schools to further reduce exam centric learning, however the percentage keeps reducing as a student is promoted to a higher class.

The question pattern is also expected to be changed under the new curriculum in accordance with international standards, but official declaration has not come yet detailing the new question pattern. The new question pattern is expected to replace current creative type questions as it could not fill up its purpose of introduction completely in current curriculum.

Schools 

Cadet Colleges are important in the education system of Bangladesh. A cadet college is a room and board collegiate administered by the Bangladesh Military. Discipline is compulsory at all cadet colleges. At present, there are 12 cadet colleges in Bangladesh, including three for girls. Four Cadet Colleges were established before 1971. Other cadet colleges were built after the Liberation War of Bangladesh.

As of September 2019, tertiary education in Bangladesh takes place at 44 government, 101 private and 3 international universities. Students can choose to further their studies in chartered accountancy, engineering, technology, agriculture and medicine at a variety of universities and colleges.

Table: Number of primary education institutions, teachers and students, 2018

{An updated data chart January, 2020 on the Primary Education can be retrieved from the following link}[https://dpe.portal.gov.bd/sites/default/files/files/dpe.portal.gov.bd/publications/7a1dd82b_a483_4083_8ae4_02238a3ee572/APSC%20Report-2019%20Final.pdf]

Primary education 

The overall responsibility of management of primary education lies with the Ministry of Primary and Mass Education (MOPME), set up as a Ministry in 1992. While MOPME is involved in formulation of policies, the responsibility of implementation rests with the Directorate of Primary Education (DPE) headed by a Director General. The Directorate of Primary Education (DPE) and its subordinate offices in the district and upazila are solely responsible for management and supervision of primary education. Their responsibilities include recruitment, posting, and transfer of teachers and other staff; arranging in-service training of teachers; distribution of free textbooks; and supervision of schools. The responsibility of school construction, repair and supply of school furniture lies with the DPE executed through the Local Government Engineering Department (LGED). The National Curriculum and Textbook Board (NCTB) is responsible for the development of curriculum and production of textbooks. According to the National Curriculum and Textbook Board, this year (2022), 34,70,16,277 textbooks have been distributed among 4,17,26,856 pre-primary, primary, secondary, ebtedayee, dakhil vocational, SSC vocational, ethnic minority groups and visually challenged students across the country. Of the total textbooks, 24,71,63,256 are for secondary and 9,98,53,021 for primary level students.

While the Ministry of Education (MOE) is responsible for formulation of policies, the Directorate of Secondary and Higher Education (DSHE) under the Ministry of Education is responsible for implementing the same at secondary and higher education levels. The NCTB is responsible for developing curriculum and publishing standard textbooks.

The Directorate of Primary Education (DPE) are responsible for conducting the two public examinations:
 Primary Education Certificate (PEC) (5 grade)
 Junior School Certificate (JSC) (8th grade)
The recent update on the PEC and JSC examinations are that "There will be no Primary Education Completion (PEC) and Junior School Certificate (JSC) examinations from 2023", disclosed Education Minister Dipu Moni at a Secretariat Press Conference in September, 2021.

Secondary education

The secondary level of education is controlled by the ten General Education boards:
 Bangladesh Madrasah Education Board for Alia Madrasah
 Barishal Education Board for Barishal Division
 Chattogram Education Board for Chattogram Division
 Cumilla Education Board for Cumilla Division
 Dhaka Education Board for Dhaka Division
 Dinajpur Education Board for Rangpur Division
 Jashore Education Board for Khulna Division
 Mymensingh Education Board for Mymensingh Division
 Rajshahi Education Board for Rajshahi Division
 Sylhet Education Board for Sylhet Division

The boards' headquarters are located in Baksibazar, Dhaka, Barishal, Cumilla, Chattogram, Dhaka, Dinajpur, Jessore, Mymensingh, Rajshahi and Sylhet.

Nine region-based Boards of Intermediate and Secondary Education (BISE) are responsible for conducting the two public examinations:
 Secondary School Certificate (SSC) (10th grade)
 Higher Secondary School Certificate (HSC) (12th grade)

At the school level, in the case of non-government secondary schools, School Management Committees (SMC), and at the intermediate college level, in the case of non-government colleges, Governing Bodies (GB), formed as per government directives, are responsible for mobilizing resources, approving budgets, controlling expenditures, and appointing and disciplining staff. While teachers of non-government secondary schools are recruited by concerned SMCs observing relevant government rules, teachers of government secondary schools are recruited centrally by the DSHE through a competitive examination.

In government secondary schools, there is not an SMC. The headmaster is solely responsible for running the school and is supervised by the deputy director of the respective zone. Parent Teachers Associations (PTAs), however, exist to ensure a better teaching and learning environment.

Tertiary education

At the tertiary level, universities are regulated by the University Grants Commission. There are three types of Universities in Bangladesh: Public, Private, and International. Some colleges providing tertiary education are affiliated under the National University. Each of the private medical colleges is affiliated with a public university. Universities in Bangladesh are autonomous bodies administered by statutory bodies such as Syndicate, Senate, Academic Council, etc. in accordance with provisions laid down in their respective acts.

Universities in Bangladesh represent about 150 academic bodies of the conventional higher education institution (HEI) in Bangladesh. Segmented by management and financial structure, these include 43 public universities, 103 private universities, 2 international universities, 31 specialized colleges, and 2 special universities. There are specialized universities in all categories offering courses principally in technological studies, medical studies, business studies and Islamic studies. There are two private universities dedicated solely to female students. The number of universities is growing mostly in and around the capital city of Dhaka.

Public University

Public universities are heavily subsidized by Government of Bangladesh to let students from most financial conditions study in these institutes. They admit students via competitive written standardized tests after meeting eligible High School grade criteria with little to no regards for extracurricular activities. Number of foreign teachers and students in these universities are very limited although many of them accept students passing from alternative curriculums.

Private University
 
Most of the Universities of Bangladesh are private. Unlike public universities they're not given financial support by Government. They're regulated by University Grants Commission along with public universities. By law, all private universities must get a permanent campus within 12 years of starting operations. Foreign students and teachers are more often found in private universities due to more flexible requirements than their public counterparts. Private medical colleges must be under a public university, currently no private medical college in Bangladesh is providing post graduate degrees, and other private universities are allowed to provide Master's degree but not MPhil or PhD.

Technical and vocational education

The Technical and Vocational Education System provides courses related to various applied and practical areas of science, technology and engineering, or focuses on a specific specialized area. Course duration ranges from one month to four years. The Technical Education Board controls technical and vocational training in the secondary level and also Two years HSC BM/Vocational in higher secondary level.

The Directorate of Technical Education (DTE) is responsible for the planning, development, and implementation of technical and vocational education in the country. Curriculum is implemented by BTEB. In the Technical Education System, after obtaining a Diploma-in-Engineering degree (four-year curriculum) from the institutes listed below, students can further pursue their educational career by obtaining a bachelor's degree from Engineering & Technology Universities. It normally it takes an additional two and a half to three years of coursework to obtain a bachelor's degree, although some students take more than three years to do so. They can then enroll in post-graduate studies. Students can also study CA (Chartered Accounting) after passing HSC or bachelor's degree and subject to fulfilling the entry criteria of the Institute of Chartered Accountants of Bangladesh (ICAB).
 Bangladesh Sweden Polytechnic Institute Bangladesh Sweden Polytechnic Institute or Swedish as it is commonly known, is a government Diploma Engineering College located in Kaptai, Rangamati Hill Tracts in Bangladesh which Established on 1963.
 Barisal Polytechnic Institute – one of the largest polytechnic institutes in Bangladesh
 BCMC College of Engineering & Technology – ISO certified and the largest private engineering college in Bangladesh, situated in Jessore
 Bogura Polytechnic Institute – one of the largest polytechnic institutes in Bangladesh
 Brahmanbaria Polytechnic Institute – a government technical institute in Brahmanbaria a state-supported technical academic institute, established in 2005
 Comilla Polytechnic Institute – founded in 1962, one of the largest and well-reputed government polytechnic institutes
 Chittagong Polytechnic Institute – provides theoretical and practical education of basic Engineering and technology
 Dhaka Polytechnic Institute – a government technical institute in Dhaka
 Feni Polytechnic Institute – created on 29 February 1964, has around 2,000 students
 Graphic Arts Institute – the only government printing and graphic design institute in Bangladesh
 Jessore Polytechnic Institute
 Khulna Polytechnic Institute – a government technical institute in Khulna
 Kushtia Polytechnic Institute –  largest polytechnic institute in Bangladesh
 Mangrove Institute of Science and Technology – a non-government technical institute in Khulna
 Mymensingh Polytechnic Institute – established in 1963 by the Ford Foundation
 Patuakhali Polytechnic Institute – one of the largest polytechnic institutes in Bangladesh
 Rajshahi Polytechnic Institute – a government technical institute in Rajshahi
 Sylhet Polytechnic Institute – a state-supported technical academic institute, established in 1955 by the Pakistani Government

Alternative education system

International schools

International Schools are mainly private schools where all the courses are taught in English and in International curriculums except language subjects i.e. Bangla or French. These schools in Bangladesh follow the Cambridge Assessement International Education, Pearson Edexel, International Bacculaureate and some other curriculums where students are prepared for taking their Ordinary Level (O Level), IGCSE (Cambridge)/ International GCSE (Edexel), Advanced Level (A Level), and IBDP examinations. The Ordinary level / IGCSE, International GCSE/ Advanced Level / IBDP examinations are considered international equivalent to the Secondary School Certificate (SSC) and Higher Secondary School Certificate (HSC) examinations respectively and accepted by local Colleges and Universities. Most students sit for these exams through attending the registered schools in Bangladesh who follow the curriculums. Those who do not attend a school that follows the British curriculums (not International Bacculaureate) may also sit for their Ordinary, IGCSE and Advanced Level examinations from the British Council as a private candidate. These examinations are conducted under the supervision of the British Council in Bangladesh. The school examinations conducted by the British Council takes place twice a year. Currently, there are two boards operating from Bangladesh for Ordinary and Advanced Level Examinations, which are Pearson Edexcel and Cambridge Assessment International Education.
However Bangladesh has recently opened English version schools translating National Curriculum textbooks into English except the mandatory Bangla subject.

Madrasah education
The Madrasah Education System focuses on religious education, teaching all the basics of education in a religious environment. Religious studies are taught in Arabic and the students in some areas also serve the local area masjids. Students also have to complete all the courses from the General Education System. Many privately licensed Madrasas take in homeless children and provide them with food, shelter and education, e.g. Jamia Tawakkulia Renga Madrasah in Sylhet.

There are two types of madrasas in Bangladesh. One, the "Quomi" madrasas, are privately funded. The other, the "Alia" madrasas, are privately owned but subsidised by the government (the government spends 11.5% of its education budget on alia madrasahs, paying 80% of teacher and administrator salaries). Quomi madrasahs account for 1.9% of total primary enrollment and 2.2% of secondary enrollment; aliyah madrasahs account for 8.4% of primary and 19% of secondary enrollment. The alia system is like the general education system, except that Arabic is taught in addition to general education. The Madrasah Education Board covers religious education in government-registered Madrasahs in the secondary level. After passing "Alim", a student can enroll for three additional years to obtain a "Fazil" level. Students can go for further general education and earn a university degree. After passing successfully, they can further enroll for another two years to obtain a "Kamil" level degree. 

The following table provides a statistical comparison of the "Quomi" and "Alia" madrasah systems.

Profile of madrasa education in Bangladesh

Refugee education
 
As of 2020, approximately one-third of refugee Rohingya children were able to access primary education, primarily through temporary centers run by international organizations. UNICEF runs approximately 1,600 learning centers across the country, educating around 145,000 children. Beginning in April 2020, UNICEF and the Government of Bangladesh were scheduled to enroll 10,000 Rohingya children in schools where they will be taught the Myanmar school curriculum.

Grading system 
In Bangladesh, grades equal or above 33% (or one third) is considered as a passing grade.

Since the education system of Bangladesh is completely controlled by the government up to higher secondary level (or grade 12), the grading system up to this point is more or less the same. For each subject, grades are converted into 'grade points (GP)' and are summed up and divided by the total number of subjects, and thus is called 'grade point average (GPA)'. The highest achievable GPA is 5.0. There is also a 'letter grade (LG)' that indicates a range of GPA for total result, or a single GP for a single subject. The grading system is shown below.

However, in secondary and higher secondary Level, a fourth subject or optional subject system is introduced. Although failing in the fourth subject will not be judged as a failure for the whole, Doing good in it can contribute to gain additional grade points. The additional grade points received is simply (GP in 4th subject) – 2. While counting GPA the algorithm can be simply written as:

Here, TGP is the total grade points gained in subjects other than optional. OGP is the additional GP gained in 4th subject. N is the number of total subjects of course without optional.

Note that GPA cannot be above 5. Additional GP gained from the optional subject will not be counted if the GP of the subject is less than or equal to 2.

Gaining a GPA of 5.0 or A+ is naturally considered as a good result. However, since a student can gain grade far above the required 80% to receive a GPA of 5.0, the actual grades received in each subject is also included in the official mark sheets given by the education board for PSC,JSC, SSC and HSC exams. There is also an unofficial term called Golden A+ which means receiving A+ in all subjects, since a student can receive a perfect GPA also without gaining more than 80% marks in all subjects thanks to the fourth subject system.

Non-formal education
There exists a substantial number of NGO-run non-formal schools, catering mainly to the drop-outs of the government and non-government primary schools. Very few NGOs, however, impart education for the full five-year primary education cycle. Because of this, on completion of their two-to-three-year non-formal primary education in NGO-run schools, students normally re-enter into government/non-government primary schools at higher classes.

There are Non-Governmental Schools (NGO) and Non-Formal Education Centers (NFE) and many of these are funded by the government. The largest NFE program is the much reputed BRAC program. However, not all NFE graduates continue on to secondary school.

NGO-run schools differ from other non-government private schools. While the private schools operate like private enterprises often guided by commercial interests, NGO schools operate mainly in areas not served either by the government or private schools, essentially to meet the educational needs of vulnerable groups in the society. They usually follow an informal approach to suit the special needs of children from these vulnerable groups. But nowadays, some NGO schools are operating into places where there are both private and government schools.

Similarly, in NGO-run schools there does not exist any SMC. The style of management differs depending upon differences in policies pursued by different NGOs. Some are centrally managed within a highly bureaucratic set-up, while others enjoy considerable autonomy.

Different NGOs pursue different policies regarding recruitment of teachers. Some prepare a panel of prospective teachers on the basis of a rigorous test and recruit teachers from this panel. Other NGOs recruit teachers rather informally from locally available interested persons.

Current issues

Current government projects to promote the education of children in Bangladesh include compulsory primary education for all, free education for girls up to grade 10, stipends for female students, a nationwide integrated education system and a food-for-education literacy movement. A large section of the country's national budget is set aside to help put these programs into action and to promote education and make it more accessible. Recent years have seen these efforts pay off and the Bangladesh education system is strides ahead of what it was only a few years ago. Now even national curriculum books from class 5 to class 12 are distributed freely among all students and schools.

The educational system of Bangladesh faces several problems. In the past, Bangladesh education was primarily a British modelled upper class affair with all courses given in English and very little being done for the common people. The Bangladesh education board has taken steps to leave such practices in the past and is looking forward to education as a way to provide a poverty-stricken nation with a brighter future.
As Bangladesh is an overpopulated country, there is a huge demand to turn its population into labour, which is why proper education is needed and proper help from government in the educational sectors of Bangladesh is crucial.

Universities and the existing system of academic curricula in Bangladesh are not still observed to be encouraging industry-oriented critical thinking and primarily utilizing rote-learning which encourages passivity under a corporatized model as well as the country has not implemented Outcome-based-Education (OBE) blended system yet, encompassing classroom and laboratory-based teachings with industry-oriented practical learnings for undergraduate and postgraduate engineering academic degrees.

Education expenditure as percentage of GDP
Public expenditure on education lies on the fringes of 2 percent of GDP with a minimum of 0.94 percent in 1980 and a maximum of 2.2 percent in 2007.

Qualitative dimension
The education system lacks a sound Human Resource Development and deployment system, and this has demoralised the primary education sector personnel, including teachers, and contributes to poor performance. Poverty is a big threat to primary education. In Bangladesh, the population is very high. The number of seats available in colleges is less than the number of students who want to enroll, and the number of seats available in universities is also less than the number of students who passed higher secondary level and want to join in a university. The cost of education is increasing day by day, and as a result many students are unable to afford it.

One study found a 15.5% primary school teacher absence rate.

Gender disparity
In Bangladesh, gender discrimination in education occurs amongst the rural households but is non-existent amongst rich households. Bangladesh has achieved gender parity in Primary and Secondary education with significant progress made in higher education There is great difference in the success rates of boys, as compared to girls in Bangladesh. Girls do much better and outperform boys in almost every field of Education. However, in recent years some progress has been made in trying to fix this problem.

School attendance
The low performance in primary education is a matter of concern, mostly in rural areas. School drop-out rates and grade repetition rates are high in rural areas. Poor school attendance and low contact time in school are factors contributing to low level of learning achievement. However the situation is very different in urban areas like Dhaka.

Religion and education
Madrasah education in Bangladesh is heavily influenced by religion. However, in the schools and colleges, in most cases, the teachers in the religious and moral education classes in Bangladeshi schools specifically place more emphasis on Islamic studies than universal religious education. Although the non-Muslim students receive books as per their respective religions and haves exams accordingly, many of them hardly or even don't receive formal religious education from their schools and thus have to study on their own. The schools that have religion teachers of different beliefs separate students to take class on their respective religions for the class period, then they mix up together again after finishing the class. Semi-governmental educational institutions often appoint mawlanas to conduct religious classes who are reluctant to teach non-Muslim students their own textbooks. In the country's national curriculum, as part of the subject Bengali, Prophet Muhammad's Farewell Sermon is taught to all students regardless of religion and caste in 5th grade; the continuity of study on Muhammad's life-related topics can be seen in the later classes as well and is obligatory for students from all creeds. Islamic History and Heritage is also included in humanities at college level.

Literacy rate
Recently, the literacy rate of Bangladesh has improved as it stands at 74.7%  due to the modernization of schools and education funds.

See also

 Light of Hope
 List of medical colleges in Bangladesh
 List of schools in Bangladesh
 List of universities in Bangladesh

References

Further reading

 
 
 Sedere, Upali M. (2000). "Institutional Capacity Building Through Human Resource Development". Directorate of Primary Education/PEDPQI Project of NORAD, Bangladesh.
 Sedere, Upali M. (1996). "General Education Project (CR2118BD) Report". World Bank.
 Literacy In Bangladesh
 Information Literacy: Bangladesh perspective
 Information Literacy: A challenge for Bangladesh
 Female Secondary School Assistance Project: Bangladesh
 Literacy and Adult Education
 The Girls' Stipend Program in Bangladesh
 Country Report 2006 Bangladesh
 Bangladesh Education Sector Overview
 UNESCO Information and Monitoring Sheet
 UNESCO Survey
 UNICEF Statistics
 Bangladesh, pre-primary education and the school learning improvement plan: promising EFA practices in the Asia-Pacific region; case study
 Education for All 2015 National Review

External links

 Bangladesh Ministry of Education
 Bangladesh Secondary Education Board
 Education Result Bd
 University Grants Commission
 Bangladesh Bureau of Education Information and Statistics
 Bangladesh Board of Intermediate and Secondary Education in Sylhet